Luitz-Morat (1884–1929) was a French actor, screenwriter and film director.

Selected filmography
 A Roman Orgy (1911)
 The City Destroyed (1924)
 Surcouf (1925)
 Jean Chouan (1926)
 The Chocolate Girl (1927)
 Odette (1928)
 A Foolish Maiden (1929)

References

Bibliography
 Dayna Oscherwitz. Past Forward: French Cinema and the Post-Colonial Heritage. SIU Press, 2010.

External links

1884 births
1929 deaths
French male film actors
French male silent film actors
20th-century French male actors
French male screenwriters
20th-century French screenwriters
Film directors from Paris
20th-century French male writers